Launch My Line is an American reality competition series which premiered on December 2, 2009, on the Bravo cable channel. The show features professionals competing against one another in hopes of winning the chance to launch their own clothing line. Each contestant was paired with a professional designer. The show is hosted by Dean and Dan Caten, founders of fashion label Dsquared².

Contestants
There were 10 contestants competing in Launch My Line.  In the order eliminated:

Contestant progress

 Merle won immunity.
 Merle was in the Bottom 3, but was safe because she had won immunity.

Key
 The designer won Launch My Line
 The designer won the challenge.
 The designer had one of the highest scores for that challenge, but did not win.
 The designer had one of the lowest scores for that challenge, but was not eliminated.
 The designer lost and was out of the competition.

Episodes

References

External links
 

Bravo (American TV network) original programming
2009 American television series debuts
Fashion-themed reality television series
2010 American television series endings
2000s American reality television series
2010s American reality television series
English-language television shows